This is a list of bridges documented by the Historic American Engineering Record in the U.S. state of New York.

Bridges

See also
List of tunnels documented by the Historic American Engineering Record in New York

References

List
New York
Bridges
Bridges
List